The 1962 Detroit Tigers season was a season in American baseball. The team finished tied for third place in the American League with a record of 85–76, 10½ games behind the New York Yankees.

Offseason 
 October 12, 1961: Gerry Staley was released by the Tigers.
 October 23, 1961: Frank House was released by the Tigers.
 Prior to 1962 season (exact date unknown)
Arlo Brunsberg was signed as an amateur free agent by the Tigers.
Conrad Cardinal was signed as an amateur free agent by the Tigers.

Regular season

Season standings

Record vs. opponents

Notable transactions 
 June 1962: Al Pehanick (minors) was traded by the Tigers to the Pittsburgh Pirates for Coot Veal.

Roster

Player stats

Batting

Starters by position 
Note: Pos = Position; G = Games played; AB = At bats; H = Hits; Avg. = Batting average; HR = Home runs; RBI = Runs batted in

Other batters 
Note: G = Games played; AB = At bats; H = Hits; Avg. = Batting average; HR = Home runs; RBI = Runs batted in

Pitching

Starting pitchers 
Note: G = Games pitched; IP = Innings pitched; W = Wins; L = Losses; ERA = Earned run average; SO = Strikeouts

Other pitchers 
Note: G = Games pitched; IP = Innings pitched; W = Wins; L = Losses; ERA = Earned run average; SO = Strikeouts

Relief pitchers 
Note: G = Games pitched; W = Wins; L = Losses; SV = Saves; ERA = Earned run average; SO = Strikeouts

Farm system 

LEAGUE CHAMPIONS: Thomasville

See also

 1962 in Michigan

Notes

References 

1962 Detroit Tigers season at Baseball Reference

Detroit Tigers seasons
Detroit Tigers season
Detroit Tigers
1962 in Detroit